The 1935 World Table Tennis Championships women's doubles was the eighth edition of the women's doubles championship.
Mária Mednyánszky and Anna Sipos defeated Marie Kettnerová and Marie Šmídová in the final by three sets to one to record a sixth consecutive world title.

Results

See also
 List of World Table Tennis Championships medalists

References

-
-